Padehha (also Romanized as Padehhā and Padehā) is a village in Marzdaran Rural District, Marzdaran District, Sarakhs County, Razavi Khorasan Province, Iran. At the 2006 census, its population was 84, in 15 families.

References 

Populated places in Sarakhs County